Bonucci is an Italian surname. Notable people with the surname include:

Alberto Bonucci (1918–1969), Italian film actor
Leonardo Bonucci (born 1987), Italian footballer

See also
36036 Bonucci, main-belt asteroid
Benucci
Bonacci

Italian-language surnames